In Catholic canon law, affinity is an impediment to marriage of a couple due to the relationship which either party has as a result of a kinship relationship created by another marriage or as a result of extramarital intercourse. The relationships that give rise to the impediment have varied over time. Marriages and sexual relations between people in an affinity relationship are regarded as incest.

Today, the relevant principle within the Catholic Church is that "affinity does not beget affinity"—i.e., there is no affinity between one spouse's relatives and the other spouse's relatives. Canon 109 of the Code of Canon Law of the Catholic Church provides that affinity is an impediment to the marriage of a couple, and is a relationship which "arises from a valid marriage, even if not consummated, and exists between a man and the blood relatives of the woman and between the woman and the blood relatives of the man." Also, affinity "is reckoned in such a way that the blood relations of the man are related by affinity to the woman in the same line and the same degree, and vice versa."

Historical development

Mosaic law

Marriage to a brother's widow is prohibited, but not to a deceased wife's sister. However, as an exception,  requires a brother to marry his brother's widow if the brother died without issue, in a so-called levirate marriage.

Roman law
Roman civil law prohibited marriages within four degrees of consanguinity but had no degrees of affinity with regards to marriage. However, the rule was that, if an issue of affinity arose, at whatever consanguineal level a couple was joined was considered the same level as regarded affinity. Roman civil laws prohibited any marriage between parents and children, either in the ascending or descending line ad infinitum. Adoption was considered the same as affinity in that an adoptive father could not marry an unemancipated daughter or granddaughter even if the adoption had been dissolved. Slaves, as such, could not contract a legal marriage, but if freed were then subject to the general rules. Also, a marriage contracted within the prohibited degrees of consanguinity or affinity if contracted bona fide, out of ignorance of any impediments, is allowed to stand and any children of this union were considered legitimate.

Historical Catholic canon law
Regarding itself as not being bound by Old Testament commandments, the early Christian church followed Roman civil law, as the law of the land. The Christian emperors modified the rules from time to time and extended the civil law impediment to the first degree of collateral affinity. The church extended the impediment to relationships created by illicit intercourse. The Council of Elvira, prohibited the marriage of a widower with his deceased wife's sister. The prohibition became slowly more extensive. By the early 9th century, the Western Church had increased the number of prohibited degrees of consanguinity from four to seven. The method of calculating relationships was also changed to simply count the number of generations back to a common ancestor. The church also prohibited affinity to the same seven degrees. While the impediment of affinity is close to but not as compelling as that of consanguinity, the reasoning behind the prohibited degrees of affinity being treated the same as that of consanguinity is the nearness to the blood relatives by the very act of sexual intercourse.

Prior to the Fourth Council of the Lateran (1215), the Church recognized two additional forms of affinity. Firstly, when a man married a widow, her relatives as well as those of her former husband were considered the man's relatives and treated as if they were his blood relatives. Secondly, if the woman's first husband had been a widower then the blood relatives of his first wife became the woman's relatives and, by her subsequent marriage, were also the new husband's relatives by affinity. Also, a woman's children by a deceased husband, as well as the children of her husband by a deceased wife, were considered related by affinity. So the subsequent marriages of step-siblings carried the same prohibitions as if they were related by blood. The principle established was "affinity begot affinity."

The Fourth Lateran Council removed the second type of affinity rule and the new axiom became: "affinity does not beget affinity", which is the principle followed in the modern Catholic Church. It also limited both affinity and consanguinity prohibitions to the fourth degree, but retained the same method of calculating, counting back to a common ancestor. The Council of Trent (1545–1563) limited the impediment to marriage on account of affinity in cases when the affinity is created outside of marriage (e.g., by force or extra-matrimonial intercourse) to the second degree of affinity.

Dispensation
As the affinity rules have their origin in ecclesiastical and not divine law, impediments can be dispensed by the competent Church authority. The Pope or a bishop may grant a dispensation to a marriage when the affinity rules would be breached.

Contemporary Christian positions
The present Catholic Church position is that affinity is covered by ecclesiastical law and bishops are permitted to dispense any impediments, short of any order of priesthood or affinity in the direct line, if it stems from lawful sexual relationships.

The modern laws of the Anglican Church regarding affinity are found in the Book of Common Prayer, which were revised from time to time. The Deceased Wife's Sister's Marriage Act 1907 removed the impediment to marrying a late wife's sister. Restrictions were also relaxed by the Marriage Act 1949 s. 1 and the Marriage (Prohibited Degrees of Relationship) Act 1986 s. 1. The Anglican Communion allows marriages beyond the second degree of affinity.

However, the Greek patriarchs and bishops may grant dispensations with a certain degree of freedom or choose to adhere to the letter of the law. The Nestorian Church has few restrictions on affinity begetting affinity. The Armenian Apostolic Church restricts affinity to the fourth degree, while the policy of Oriental Orthodoxy in general is very close to that of the Roman Catholic canons. Conservative Lutherans also prohibit marriage within close degrees of affinity, even if not specifically outlawed by the state.

See also
 Affinity (law)
 Consanguinity

References

 

Catholic matrimonial canon law
Marriage in Christianity
Impediments (Catholic canon law)
Affinity (law)